Mike de Albuquerque (born 24 June 1947, Wimbledon, London) is an English musician, who was a member of the progressive rock band Electric Light Orchestra from 1972 to 1974.

Biography
In 1971, in partnership with percussionist Frank Ricotti, Albuquerque released the jazz-rock album First Wind. Under the name 'Ricotti and Albuquerque', the band featured Albuquerque on guitar and vocals and Ricotti on vibraphone, alto saxophone and percussion, with Trevor Tomkins on drums, Chris Laurence on electric and acoustic bass and John Taylor on electric piano, supplemented by Michael Keen and Henry Lowther on trumpet.

Between 1972 and 1974, he was the bass player for Electric Light Orchestra. He left for domestic reasons, during the recording sessions for the group's fourth album Eldorado, and was replaced by Kelly Groucutt. He released two solo progressive rock albums, We May Be Cattle But We've All Got Names (1973) and Stalking The Sleeper (1976). Albuquerque also featured as a guitarist and vocalist alongside Mik Kaminski in Violinski. His contributions on record for ELO were ELO 2, On the Third Day, The Night the Light Went On in Long Beach and some of Eldorado. His song "My Darling Girl" was recorded by Tim Hardin for his last album, Nine, in 1973.

In 1982, he founded the band Sundance, along with Mike Hurst and Mary Hopkin. They released one album, Sundance, in 1982 on Angel Air Records, which was re-released on CD in 2002

Discography

Solo and collaborations
 First Wind, (Ricotti & Albuquerque), (with Frank Ricotti), 1971, Pegasus: PEG 2 
 We May Be Cattle But We've All Got Names, 1973, RCA Victor: SF 8383
 Stalking The Sleeper, 1976, Warner Bros.: K56276

With Sundance 
 Sundance, 1982, Angel Air: SJPCD113

References

1947 births
Living people
Electric Light Orchestra members
English rock bass guitarists
Male bass guitarists
People from Wimbledon, London
English rock singers
English male singers